Hegner is a surname, and may refer to:

 Anna Hegner (1881–1963), Swiss violinist and composer
 Anton Hegner (1861–1915), Danish cellist and composer
 Bertha Hofer Hegner (1862–1937), American educator and promoter of the Kindergarten Movement 
 Franz Hegner, Swiss modern pentathlete
 Georg Hegner (1897–1985), Danish épée and foil fencer
 Jenő Hégner-Tóth (1894–1915), Hungarian water polo player
 Ludvig Hegner (1851–1923), Danish composer